Catriona McKay is Scottish harpist and composer. She is a contemporary explorer on the Scottish harp (Clàrsach), having collaborated with folk and experimental musicians, as well as co-designing the Starfish McKay harp.

She is a member of the band Fiddlers' Bid and the Chris Stout Quintet.

Discography
 Catriona McKay (2002, Glimster) 
 Starfish (2007, Glimster)
 Harponium (2014, Glimster)

with Chris Stout
 Laebrack (2005, Greentrax Recordings)
 White Nights (2010, McKay Stout)
 Seavaigers (2014, McKay Stout)

with Chris Stout and Seamus Begley
 BEGLEY MCKAY STOUT (2014, McKay Stout)

with Olov Johansson
 Foogy  (2009, Olov Johansson Musik)
 The auld Harp (2013, Olov Johansson Musik)

Fiddlers’ Bid
 Hamnataing (1998, Greentrax)
 Da Farder Ben Da Welcomer (2001, Greentrax)
 Naked and Bare (2005, Greentrax)
 All Dressed in Yellow (2009, Hairst Blinks)

Strange Rainbow with Alistair MacDonald
 invisible from land and sea (2008)
 Skimmerin (2009)

Chris Stout
 The First O' the Darkenin''' (2004, Greentrax)
 Devil’s Advocate (2007 as Chris Stout Quintet, Greentrax)
 Chris Stout's Brazilian Theory - Live in Concert (2011, Chris Stout)

Other collaborations
 Aidan O'Rourke: An Tobar'' (2011, Navigator) 
 Transatlantic Sessions 3(2007 BBC 2 ‘Scotland’s Music with Phil Cunningham’)

Awards
 O’Carolan International Harp Festival in Keadue, Co. Roscommon, Ireland, harp champion (1990s)
 Royal Scottish Academy of Music and Drama (RSAMD), first class honours BA (1990s)
 BBC Radio 3 ‘Young Musician‘, finalist (1999)
 Jakez Francois International Celtic Harp Competition in Nantes, winner (2004)
 Scots Trad Music Awards ‘Instrumentalist of the Year’ (2007 and 2014)
 (As a member of the band) Scots Trad Music Awards ‘Album of the Year’ for Chris Stout Quintet's ‘Devil’s Advocate’ (2007) about as Fiddlers' Bid, see Fiddlers' Bid#Awards and achievements

References

External links 
 Catriona McKay
 catriona mckay & chris stout | mckay stout music
 YouTube Harp & Fiddle, Catriona McKay & Chris Stout

Living people
Scottish folk harpists
Musicians from Dundee
Alumni of the Royal Conservatoire of Scotland
Shetland music
Year of birth missing (living people)